Marshal Baghramyan is a Yerevan Metro station. It is one of the original metro stations in the city of Yerevan and was opened to the public on 7 March, 1981. It was known by the name Saralandzhi, until it was changed to the current name in 1982. It is named after Marshal of the Soviet Union Ivan Bagramyan.

References

Yerevan Metro stations
Railway stations opened in 1981
1981 establishments in Armenia